Scanilepis is an extinct genus of prehistoric bony fish that lived during the Rhaetian-Hettangian stages (Late Triassic-Lower Jurassic boundary). The type species, S. dubia, is known from the Rhaetian freshwater deposits of the Bjuv member of the Höganäs Formation, southwestern Sweden. A second species, S. spitzbergensis was described from the Hettangian of the Festning section of the Grøfjorden area in Spitsbergen, Norway. This fish was originally identified as a member of the genus Gyrolepis, as Gyrolepis dubius, being latter assigned to it´s own genus and classified as a member of Palaeonisciformes. Latter works placed it as a taxon close to the origin of the family Amiidae, until was found latter to belong to it´s own family (Scanilepididae) and order, Scanilepiformes. Regarding to the microstructure of its scales, Scanilepis approaches the condition of Polypterus or Erpetoichthys more than any other genera.

See also

 Prehistoric fish
 List of prehistoric bony fish

References

Mesozoic fish of Europe
Late Triassic fish of Europe
Triassic bony fish
Jurassic bony fish
Triassic fish of Europe
Jurassic fish of Europe
Cladistia